The William and Ida Friday Center for Continuing Education is a unit of the University of North Carolina at Chapel Hill. The center was created to serve the needs of nontraditional students through continuing education programs and services.

The Friday Center 
The Friday Center has three main areas of operation: a conference center, credit programs for part-time students, and professional development and enrichment programs.

Credit programs
Through the Friday Center's Credit Programs for Part-time Students, part-time learners can take classes on the UNC-Chapel Hill campus or from a distance. Distance education courses can be taken online or by correspondence, within a semester schedule or in self-paced format. Through the Friday Center, both undergraduate and post-baccalaureate students have access to most courses offered by UNC-Chapel Hill without needing to be admitted as full-time students.

Professional development and enrichment programs 
The Friday Center offers noncredit courses and seminars for personal enrichment and professional development.

Enrichment Learning
Each spring and fall, the Friday Center announces a new collection of courses in its Community Classroom Series. These small classes, led by UNC faculty and staff and local professionals, generally meet weekly for four to six two-hour sessions at the Friday Center.

Introduced in fall 2005, a series of programs called What's the Big Idea? is presented twice a year in partnership with UNC's Office of Research Development and Endeavors magazine. Each new series features faculty experts from various disciplines who present new research in the sciences and engage participants in discussion on its impact on current events in the state, nation, and world.

Professional Development 
The Friday Center offers professional development seminars and workshops on a variety of popular topics including management, consulting, public speaking, writing, and leadership. The Friday Center's professional development offerings are developed in partnership with university experts and professional associations.

Conference facility 
The continuing education conference facility  was built in 1991, primarily to serve the conference facility needs of the university. Distinguishing elements of the building include a glass ceiling and polished granite interior walls. The center hosts approximately 600 events with around 50,000 participants annually. Meeting rooms and audiovisual support systems are designed to support the needs of adult learners. The building has 23 meeting areas. The building is located about three miles (5 km) from the heart of the UNC-Chapel Hill campus, with close access to major highways.

Meeting Rooms
Most rooms have built-in projection and sound systems, remote light-dimming systems, handicapped accessibility, and ergonomically designed seating. Meeting spaces include a 420-seat auditorium, a seminar room, large and small meeting rooms with flexible seating options, a smart classroom with 25 direct fiber-optic connections, an executive boardroom, a 416-seat dining room, lounges, and day offices.

Use Policy
All programs conducted at the Friday Center must have a clearly identifiable continuing education component.

William and Ida Friday 
The William and Ida Friday Center for Continuing Education is named in honor of two prominent North Carolinians noted for lifetime service to education, the arts, and public health. William C. Friday served as president of the University of North Carolina for thirty years. A painter and sculptor, his wife Ida Friday has promoted the arts and has played an active role in North Carolina's civic, cultural, and educational organizations. The Fridays have received numerous awards and honors, including the North Carolina Public Service Award and the Long Leaf Pine Award for their service to the state. Mr. and Mrs. Friday are graduates of UNC-Chapel Hill, where Mr. Friday earned a degree in law and Mrs. Friday earned a master's degree in public health.

References

External links
Official webpage

University of North Carolina at Chapel Hill